The United States Court of Appeals for Veterans Claims (in case citations, Vet. App.) is a federal court of record that was established under Article I of the United States Constitution, and is thus referred to as an Article I tribunal (court).  The court has exclusive national jurisdiction to provide independent federal judicial oversight and review of final decisions of the Board of Veterans' Appeals.

Overview 

The United States Court of Appeals for Veterans Claims is commonly referred to as the Veterans Court, USCAVC, or simply CAVC.  The court was previously known as the United States Court of Veterans Appeals, but was changed to the current name by the Veterans Programs Enhancement Act on March 1, 1999 (Pub.L. No. 105-368). Opinions for the Veterans Court and other information about the Court can be found at www.uscourts.cavc.gov.

The Veterans Court is located in Washington, D.C. but may sit anywhere in the United States.  While the Board of Veterans' Appeals is part of the United States Department of Veterans Affairs, the Veterans Court is not a part of the VA, it is an independent federal court.  The Veterans Court hears oral arguments and reviews final Board decisions, the record before the agency, and briefs of the parties on appeal. Each judge on the Court serves a 15-year term.

History 

The U.S. Court of Appeals for Veterans Claims was created on November 18, 1988, by the Veterans' Judicial Review Act of 1988.  Prior to the establishment of the U.S. Court of Appeals for Veterans Claims, from the U.S. Revolutionary War to 1988, there was no judicial recourse for veterans who were denied benefits.  The United States Department of Veterans Affairs, formerly titled the Veterans Administration, was the only federal administrative agency that operated without independent judicial oversight.  The Board of Veterans' Appeals, which is a part of the Department of Veterans Affairs, provided the final decision in a veteran's claim for benefits.

Veterans, advocacy groups, and veterans service organizations fought and urged Congress to provide judicial review of VA decisions since the 1950s.  The lack of judicial review persisted, however, until the increase in veterans claims following the Vietnam War.  The struggles of these veterans to obtain VA benefits highlighted the lack of independent oversight in the adjudication process.  The House Committee on Veterans' Affairs initially resisted, noting that the Department of Veterans Affairs stood in "splendid isolation as the single federal administrative agency whose major functions were explicitly insulated from judicial review."

After decades of debate, on November 18, 1988, Congress created the United States Court of Veterans Appeals.  On March 1, 1999, the Court's name was changed from the United States Court of Veterans Appeals to the United States Court of Appeals for Veterans Claims through the Veterans Programs Enhancement Act (Pub.L. No. 105-368).

From 1990 to 2016, thirteen of the seventeen jurists who served on the CAVC had been veterans.

Jurisdiction 

The U.S. Court of Appeals for Veterans Claims has "exclusive jurisdiction to review decisions of the Board of Veterans' Appeals ... [with the] power to affirm, modify, or reverse a decision of the Board [of Veterans' Appeals] or to remand the matter, as appropriate."

Judges 
Judges are appointed to the U.S. Court of Appeals for Veterans Claims by the president of the United States and confirmed by the United States Senate,  in the same manner as Article III judges.  They are appointed to serve fifteen-year appointments. Retired judges are routinely recalled to active service to assist the Court in issuing its decisions in a timely manner.

Current composition 
:

Former judges

Succession of seats

References

Further reading

External links 
 United States Court of Appeals for Veterans Claims website
 Court of Appeals for Veterans Claims Bar Association
 Veterans Consortium Pro Bono Program
 Veterans Law Library – features updates to case law; new VA regulations; law review articles; and think tank (policy institute) reports.

 
Veterans
Veterans' affairs law in the United States
1988 establishments in the United States
Courts and tribunals established in 1988